Coleophora crexella is a moth of the family Coleophoridae that can be found in Algeria, Libya and Tunisia.

The larvae feed on Traganum nudatum. They feed on the leaves of their host plant.

References

External links

crexella
Moths of Africa
Moths described in 1987